Fluor-buergerite, originally named buergerite, is a mineral species belonging to the tourmaline group.  It was first described for an occurrence in rhyolitic cavities near Mexquitic, San Luis Potosi, Mexico. It was approved as a mineral in 1966 by the IMA and named in honor of Martin J. Buerger (1903–1986), professor of mineralogy at the Massachusetts Institute of Technology.  It has also been reported from Minas Gerais, Brazil, and the Central Bohemia Region of the Czech Republic.

References

Sodium minerals
Cyclosilicates
Trigonal minerals
Minerals in space group 160
Tourmalines